Anas Sari (born 5 April 1977) is a former Syrian footballer who played for Syria national football team.

External links
worldfootball.net
11v11.com

1977 births
Syrian footballers
Living people
Syria international footballers
Place of birth missing (living people)
Association football forwards
Al-Ittihad Aleppo players
Syrian expatriate footballers
Expatriate footballers in Lebanon
Syrian expatriate sportspeople in Lebanon
Homenetmen Beirut footballers
Lebanese Premier League players
Al-Shorta Damascus players
Syrian Premier League players